Ebrahimabad (also Romanized as Ebrāhīmābād; also known as Ebrahīm Abad Rastaq and Ibrāhīmābad) is a village in Rostaq Rural District of the Central District of Ashkezar County, Yazd province, Iran. At the 2006 National Census, its population was 1,207 in 328 households. The following census in 2011 counted 1,394 people in 410 households. The latest census in 2016 showed a population of 1,509 people in 453 households; it was the largest village in its rural district.

References 

Ashkezar County

Populated places in Yazd Province

Populated places in Ashkezar County